Arrants is a surname. Notable people with the surname include:

J. Clator Arrants (died 1989), American politician
Rod Arrants (born 1944), American actor